Tai Lam Country Park, established on 23 February 1979, is a country park located in Tai Lam, at the south of Yuen Long Town, Kam Tin and Shek Kong and east of Tuen Mun Town, in the western New Territories of Hong Kong. This country park has an area of 54 km².

Etymology
The country park is named after Tai Lam where the park is located nearby. A river stream also named after the area as Tai Lam Chung. Due to the construction of a dam, the water flows into the Tai Lam Chung Reservoir. The reservoir is entirely surrounded by the country park. The reservoir is managed by the Water Supplies Department. Tai Lam Tunnel and Tai Lam railway tunnel pass through the country park underground.

The tai in Tai Lam means large. There is another area known as Siu Lam, which siu means small in Chinese.

Highlights
A series of barbecue and picnic sites are provided along Route Twisk, the Shek Kong, Pat Heung catchwater and the Tuen Mun catchwater. In addition, there are a lot of trails. For example, the MacLehose Trail and the Kap Lung Forest Trail start from the top of Route Twisk near the Country Park Management Centre. The Twisk Nature Trail near the Country Park Management Centre introduces the natural environment and human impacts in the area.

The fitness trail at So Kwun Wat catchwater provides 14 sets of fitness equipment for visitors and morning walkers.

See also
 Conservation in Hong Kong
 Tin Fu Tsai

External links

 Initial text based on information provided by the Hong Kong Agriculture, Fisheries and Conservation Department (AFCD), under the provision that the re-dissemination or reproduction is for non-commercial use. 
AFCD Tai Lam

Country parks and special areas of Hong Kong
Tsuen Wan District
Tuen Mun District
Yuen Long District